The 1933 Lippe state election was held on 15 January 1933 to elect the 21 members of the Landtag of the Free State of Lippe.

Results

References 

Lippe
Elections in North Rhine-Westphalia